Las Ventas con Peña Aguilera is a municipality located in the province of Toledo, Castile-La Mancha, Spain. According to the 2006 census (INE), the municipality had a population of 1351 inhabitants.
The municipality is located 35 km away from Toledo.

History
There were originally two villages, Las Ventillas and Peña Aguilera.
The name Ventas refers to the inns ("ventas" in Spanish) which accommodated travellers crossing the Montes de Toledo.

Economy
The economy of the place is led by agriculture, crafts and the leather industry, mainly, it is normal to find shops related to leather goods.

Near the Cabañeros National Park and in a privileged situation due to its proximity to Toledo, this municipality promotes tourism with an interesting gastronomic proposal (venison) and a tradition in leather craftsmanship.

References

Municipalities in the Province of Toledo